Kalafut Nunatak is a nunatak which marks the southeast end of the Haines Mountains, in the Ford Ranges of Marie Byrd Land, Antarctica. It was mapped by the United States Antarctic Service (1939–41) and by the United States Geological Survey from surveys and U.S. Navy air photos (1959–65). It was named by the Advisory Committee on Antarctic Names for John Kalafut, a United States Antarctic Research Program glaciologist at Byrd Station in the 1966–67 and 1968–69 seasons.

References

Nunataks of Marie Byrd Land